Malangbang or melambang is a type of medieval sailing ship from Indonesia. It is mentioned mainly in the History of Banjar. The name "malangbang" is considered to originate from the Old Javanese language, malabong (malaboṅ) which refers to a particular type of boat. Malangbang is one of Majapahit's main naval vessel types after jong and kelulus. Not much is known about this type of ship, apart from the fact that it also used oar beside the sails to propel it, broad and flat-bottomed, and was a "medium-sized" ship, between the size of jong and kelulus, larger and faster than pilang (pelang).

Lambu Mangkurat of Banjarmasin used a malangbang named Si Prabayaksa to travel to Majapahit. Quote from the Chronicle of Banjar:He sailed in full state on board the yacht (original: malangbang) called Prabayaksa, availing himself of the insignia of royalty left by his father Ampu Jatmaka: two vertical streamers adorned with gold, two tasseled staves adorned with gold, four pennons decorated with gold paint, a braided streamer looking like a centipede embroidered with gold thread and twenty pikes with tufts of red feathers adorned with spangles of gold; his lances had biring blades inlaid with gold, their shafts where decorated with dark-red and gold paint, not to mention two state sunshades decorated with gold paint, two state lances shaped like frangipani buds, inlaid with gold and with their shafts banded with gold. The yacht was adorned with marquetry of gold; its sails were of the finest cloth; the clew-lines, the stays and the sheets were of silk and had tassels of pearls; the rudder was of timbaga suasa (a copper and gold alloy), the oars of iron-wood with bands of gold and the anchor gear of undamascened steel. The ships sailing behind her were also fully dressed.

See also 

Benawa
Palari (boat)
Padewakang
Kelulus
Penjajap
Sandeq

References

Further reading 
 Adam, Ahmat (2019). Hikayat Raja Pasai. SIRD. 
 Hill, A. H. (June 1960). "Hikayat Raja-Raja Pasai". Journal of the Malaysian Branch of the Royal Asiatic Society. 33: 1–215.
 Manguin, Pierre-Yves (January 2001). "Shipshape Societies: Boat Symbolism and Political Systems in Insular Southeast Asia". Techniques & Culture [Online].
 Nugroho, Irawan Djoko (2011). Majapahit Peradaban Maritim. Suluh Nuswantara Bakti. .
 Rafiek, M. (December 2011). "Kapal dan Perahu dalam Hikayat Raja Banjar: Kajian Semantik". Borneo Research Journal. 5: 187–200.
 Ras, Johannes Jacobus (1968). Hikajat Bandjar: A Study in Malay Historiography. The Hague: Martinus Nijhoff.

Sailing ship types
Indonesian inventions
Boats of Indonesia
Indigenous boats
Sailboat types
Merchant ships